Geovanni Banguera (15 December 1995) is a footballer from El Charco, Colombia who plays as a goalkeeper for Santa Fe.

References 

Atlético Huila footballers
Colombian footballers
Sportspeople from Nariño Department
1995 births
Living people
Association football goalkeepers